Vitamin X (abbreviated VX) is a Dutch hardcore punk band from Amsterdam formed in 1997. Their sound is characterized by furious hardcore punk mixed with turbo-charged thrash, 1970s rock riffs and wild guitar solos. The members are straight edge but this does not reflect their lyrics or music. Their current line-up consists of four members: Marko Korac (vocals), Alex Koutsman (bass guitar), Danny Schneiker (drums), and Marc Emmerik (songwriter, guitar).

Known for their witty socio-political lyrical themes and energetic live performances, the band recorded several seminal full-length albums and singles on various international labels, including US label Havoc Records (Kylesa, Wolfbrigade, Fucked Up, From Ashes Rise, etc.). The band has completed multiple tours of North America, South America, Europe, Japan, Australia, Indonesia, Philippines, Mexico, and Russia. In 2001 and 2004 they played CBGB's, New York to a sold-out crowd. At a 2006 MTV live studio performance in Brasil a riot broke out after the band smashed their instruments.

Their 2008 album Full Scale Assault was recorded in Chicago by Steve Albini, famous for recording Nirvana, Iggy Pop and The Stooges, Led Zeppelin's Page and Plant, Neurosis, etc. Featuring a guest appearance by Negative Approach singer John Brannon and artwork by John Baizley of Baroness. It received critical acclaim from publications such as Metal Maniacs, Maximumrocknroll, Profane Existence, Suburban Voice, Exclaim!, and many more, several of them naming it as one of the best hardcore punk albums of 2008/2009.

In 2012 they released the album About to Crack, also recorded by Steve Albini and artwork by John Baizley.

Besides touring around the world the band plays for 10,000s of people on some of the biggest heavy music festivals. They headlined Fluff Fest several times, as well as Exit,  Obscene Extreme, Resist to Exist, and many more. In 2012 they play Europe's biggest 'extreme music festival' Hellfest featuring acts such as Ozzy Osbourne, Megadeth, Guns N' Roses but also punk acts like GBH, Discharge, Tragedy and Refused. In 2013 they were among the headliners of the Baltimore Soundstage at Maryland Deathfest, the biggest fest of its kind in North America, playing together with Infest, The Melvins, Carcass, Venom, Pentagram. After playing at 2014's Temples Fest in Bristol they again played Hellfest in 2015 with Motörhead, Billy Idol, ZZ Top, Judas Priest, and Alice Cooper.

In 2018 they sign for Southern Lord Records and release their sixth album Age of Paranoia featuring J Mascis of Dinosaur Jr and Bubba Dupree of Void and Soundgarden.

Discography 

Studio Albums
2000 See Thru Their Lies
2002 Down The Drain
2004 Bad Trip
2008 Full Scale Assault
2012 About To Crack
2018 Age Of Paranoia
EPs
1998 Straight Edge Crew
1999 Once Upon a Time...
2001 We Came Here For Fun
2001 People That Bleed
2003 split 7-inch with Blind Society (King Friday)
2003 Random Violence (Japanese tour CD, Good Luck)
2005 Rip It Out (Havoc)

They have also released multiple "best of" collections and discography tapes, mainly for overseas tours.

Members 
 Marko Korac – vocals
 Marc Emmerik – guitar, songwriter
 Alex Koutsman – bass
 Danny Schneiker – drums

Former members 
 Geert Jan – drums
 Wimmy "Zero" Koster – drums
 Paolo G. - drums
 Boka (Ratos De Porao) – drums
 Johan X – drums
 Wolfi – drums
 Eric 'Sunk' Ankersmit – guitar

References

External links 

Vitamin X US tour at Punknews.org
Vitamin X – Bad Trip at ScenePointBlank
Vitamin X Interview in Podcast at Punk.by

Musical groups established in 1997
Straight edge groups
Dutch rock music groups